Andrew Wang or Andrew Wong may refer to:
 Andrew Wang (coach), Chinese figure skating coach in Australia
 Andrew H. J. Wang (born 1945), Taiwanese biochemist
 Andrew Wong (politician), a Hong Kong politician
 Andrew Wong, a chef de cuisine of A. Wong

See also
 Andrea Wong, an American businesswoman